is a Japanese field hockey player born in Nikkō. At the 2012 Summer Olympics she competed with the Japan women's national field hockey team in the women's tournament.  She also played for Japan at the 2016 Summer Olympics.

References

External links
 

Living people
1988 births
Field hockey players at the 2012 Summer Olympics
Field hockey players at the 2016 Summer Olympics
Olympic field hockey players of Japan
Japanese female field hockey players
Field hockey players at the 2014 Asian Games
Sportspeople from Tochigi Prefecture
Asian Games competitors for Japan
20th-century Japanese women
21st-century Japanese women